D'où viens-tu Johnny ? ("Where Are You from, Johnny?") is a 1963 French film directed by Noël Howard, starring French rock and pop idols Johnny Hallyday and Sylvie Vartan.

Songs 
 "Ma guitare", etc.

References

External links 
 

French musical comedy-drama films
Italian musical comedy-drama films
French rock music films
Italian rock music films
1963 films
1960s musical comedy-drama films
Films set in the 1960s
Films shot in France
French black-and-white films
Italian black-and-white films
1963 comedy films
1963 drama films
1960s French films
1960s Italian films